K. linearis may refer to:
 Krameria linearis, a synonym for Krameria lappacea, a plant species
 Kuwanaspis linearis, the bamboo long scale, a scale insect species in the genus Kuwanaspis

See also
 Linearis